The Safety of the Queen, etc. Act 1584 (27 Eliz.1, c. 1) was an Act of the Parliament of England during the English Reformation. It required a tribunal of at least 24 peers and privy councillors to investigate "any open invasion or rebellion" in England, any attempt to injure Queen Elizabeth I or any pretender to the throne. Any person found to be guilty was to be disabled from inheriting the throne, and was to be "pursued to death by all the Queen's subjects." Also any act "whereby the Queen's life shall be shortened" was made a capital offence.

References
 Statutes at Large, vol. VI, Cambridge University Press, 1763.

See also
 Jesuits, etc. Act 1584 (27 Eliz.1, c. 2)

Treason in England
Acts of the Parliament of England (1485–1603)
1585 in law
1585 in England